Gordon Haigh (18 August 1921 – 22 August 2011) was an English professional footballer who played as an inside forward.

Having played 18 league games for Burnley in the four league seasons after World War II, he was the club's second oldest surviving player by the time of his death on 22 August 2011, four days after his 90th birthday – second only to George Knight, who was three months older and died 10 days later.

References

General
Gordon Haigh career stats at the Post-War Player Database
Gordon Haigh obituary on ClaretsMad website for Burnley FC

Specific

1921 births
2011 deaths
Footballers from Barnsley
English footballers
Association football forwards
Burnley F.C. players
Watford F.C. players
Rossendale United F.C. players
Nelson F.C. players
English Football League players
AFC Bournemouth players